The 1991–92 Bayer 04 Leverkusen season was the 45th season in the club's history and the 13th consecutive season playing in the Bundesliga since promotion from 2. Bundesliga in 1979. Leverkusen finished sixth in the league.

The club also participated in the DFB-Pokal where it reached the semi-finals, losing in penalties to Borussia Mönchengladbach.

Competitions

Overview

Bundesliga

DFB Pokal

Statistics

Squad statistics

|-
!colspan="14" align=center|Players that left the team during the season

|}

References

Bayer 04 Leverkusen seasons
Leverkusen